Amund Ringnes may refer to:

Amund Ringnes Island
Amund Ringnes (brewery owner, 1840)
Amund Ringnes (brewery owner, 1905)